LeShun Daniels Jr. (born June 4, 1995) is an American football running back who is currently a free agent. He played college football at the University of Iowa. He signed with the New England Patriots as an undrafted free agent in 2017, and has also been a member of the Los Angeles Chargers,  Washington Redskins, and Green Bay Packers.

College career
During his senior year, Daniels was voted team captain and was named the team's MVP. He posted a 1,058 rushing yards on 213 attempts while scoring 10 rushing touchdowns.

College statistics

Professional career

New England Patriots
Daniels signed with the New England Patriots as an undrafted free agent on May 5, 2017. He was waived by the Patriots on September 2, 2017.

Los Angeles Chargers
On October 4, 2017, Daniels was signed to the Los Angeles Chargers' practice squad. He was released on October 16, 2017.

Washington Redskins
On November 15, 2017, Daniels was signed by the Washington Redskins' practice squad. He was promoted to the active roster on November 21, 2017. He was placed on injured reserve on December 23, 2017.

On March 29, 2018, the Redskins waived Daniels.

Green Bay Packers
On August 18, 2018, Daniels was signed by the Green Bay Packers. He was waived on September 1, 2018.

Personal life
Daniels is the older brother of offensive lineman James Daniels, who was his teammate at Iowa, and was drafted by the Chicago Bears in the 2018 NFL Draft.  His father LeShun was a redshirted offensive lineman that played at Ohio State from 1992-1996.

References

External links
Iowa Hawkeyes bio

1995 births
Living people
Sportspeople from Warren, Ohio
Players of American football from Ohio
American football running backs
Iowa Hawkeyes football players
New England Patriots players
Los Angeles Chargers players
Washington Redskins players
Green Bay Packers players